Robert Caldebrook (fl. 1386–1388), of Leominster, Herefordshire, was an English Member of Parliament.

He was a Member (MP) of the Parliament of England for Leominster in 1386 and February 1388.

References

14th-century births
Year of death missing
English MPs 1386
People from Leominster
English MPs February 1388